Francesca Danieli (1953 – 2006) was an American collage artist, photographer, and filmmaker.

Early life
Born Francesca Costagliola in Bethesda, Maryland, Costagliola legally changed her name to Danieli at the age of 25. She earned a Bachelor of Fine Arts degree from Virginia Commonwealth University and a master's degree in business administration from Columbia University.

Career
Danieli and Julia Kim Smith co-directed the film One Nice Thing, which asked participants at the 2004 Republican and Democratic national conventions to say one nice thing about the other party. Danieli's work is included in collections of the Museum of Fine Arts Houston and the Getty Museum.

Personal life 
Danieli's husband, Gary Gensler, became chair of the U.S. Securities and Exchange Commission. The couple had three children.

Danieli died on June 27, 2006, in Baltimore, Maryland from breast cancer.

References

1953 births
2006 deaths
20th-century American women artists
21st-century American women artists
20th-century American photographers
21st-century American photographers